Michael Pinnella (born August 29, 1969) is an American keyboard player, most notably for the band Symphony X.  Michael is one of two Symphony X members to appear on all nine of the band's albums (the other being Michael Romeo).

He has released two solo albums, titled Enter By the Twelfth Gate (2004) and Ascension (2014), mostly composed of instrumental, classical-styled progressive metal.

In 2016, Pinnella ranked #11 in Loudwire's Top 25 Rock + Metal Keyboardists of All Time, praised for being an "essential component of Symphony X’s overarching epic nature".

Biography
Pinnella was born in Point Pleasant Beach, New Jersey and was encouraged since childhood to follow music. When he was four years old, he started taking piano lessons. He was heavily influenced by classic composers like Mozart, Beethoven, Chopin, and Bach.

When he was about 11 years old, he started to practice more seriously. Later in his youth, he was impressed by Yngwie Malmsteen and asked his parents to buy him a keyboard. When he got into college, he studied piano performance, theory and composition, and other musical courses. Other influences came from progressive/metal bands from the 1970s (Emerson, Lake & Palmer, Deep Purple, Black Sabbath) and from the 1980s (DIO, Ozzy Osbourne).

When Pinnella finished college, he started teaching piano in a music store. One of the fellow teachers at the store was friends with Michael Romeo from Symphony X. In 1994, he was hired by the band as a keyboardist.

Pinnella's nephew, Chris Pinnella, is a vocalist who worked with Trans-Siberian Orchestra.

Equipment

Pinnella uses the following equipment:
 
 Yamaha Motif ES7
 Roland V-Synth GT

Discography

With Symphony X

With Michael Romeo 

 The Dark Chapter (1994)

Solo 

 Enter by the Twelfth Gate (2004)
 Ascension (2014)

With Mike LePond's Silent Assassins 

 Mike LePond's Silent Assassins (2014)
 Pawn And Prophecy (2018)
 Whore of Babylon (2020)

As a guest 

 Various (Cult of One) – Whiplash (1996)
 "Strike Me Blind" (Thrashback) – Whiplash (1998)
 Various (Gone Forever) – God Forbid (2004)
 "We Will Fly" (Atomic Soul) – Russell Allen (2005)
 Various (Earthsblood) – God Forbid (2009)
 "A Vision of You" (Sonic Stomp II) – Mike Orlando (2010)
 "Sirius" (A Spoonful of Time) – Nektar (2012)

See also 
 Symphony X

References

External links
Symphony X Official Website

1969 births
American heavy metal keyboardists
Symphony X members
Living people
People from Point Pleasant Beach, New Jersey
21st-century American keyboardists
American people of Italian descent
20th-century American keyboardists